Tveito is a surname. Notable people with the surname include:

Aslak Tveito (born 1961), Norwegian scientist
Dagfinn Tveito (1927–2015), Norwegian magazine editor
Einar Tveito (1890–1958), Norwegian actor

Norwegian-language surnames